is a Japanese rower from Miyagi Prefecture. He competed in the men's lightweight double sculls event at the 2016 Summer Olympics.

References

External links
 

1984 births
Living people
Japanese male rowers
Olympic rowers of Japan
Rowers at the 2016 Summer Olympics
Sportspeople from Miyagi Prefecture
Asian Games medalists in rowing
Rowers at the 2006 Asian Games
Rowers at the 2010 Asian Games
Rowers at the 2014 Asian Games
Asian Games gold medalists for Japan
Medalists at the 2006 Asian Games
Medalists at the 2010 Asian Games
Medalists at the 2014 Asian Games